Emerson Newton-John (born September 26, 1974) is an American professional racing driver. The nephew of Olivia Newton-John, he has competed in numerous forms of motorsports, most notably in NASCAR, the ARCA Racing Series, and the Indy Lights Series.

Racing career
Newton-John competed in the Formula Holden Tasman Cup in 2000–2001, nearly winning his inaugural event in the series, and the Formula Holden Australian Drivers' Championship in 2001, finishing fifth, with a best result of 2nd; he also competed in the French Renault Megane Cup, and tested a Formula Three car. His final Formula Holden race was on September 10, 2001; the September 11 attacks resulted in financial backing for his open-wheel career drying up, and Newton-John switched to stock cars.

Newton-John made his debut in stock car racing in November 2001, competing in the ARCA Re/MAX Series at Atlanta Motor Speedway where he ran as high as 12th after starting from the back of the field. he ended up 15th. In 2002, he competed in his first NASCAR event, a Craftsman Truck Series race at New Hampshire Motor Speedway; he finished 31st in the event, following a weekend that Newton-John described as "disastrous".

In 2012, Newton-John returned to professional racing, driving an open-wheel formula car for the first time in almost eleven years in a test at Iowa Speedway. Passing a refresher test, he went on to compete in the Freedom 100 Firestone Indy Lights race, driving for Tyce Carlson's Fan Force United team. He was 6th fastest in practice and qualified in 8th position. He was involved in a multi-car incident on the fifth lap of the event, and was credited with a 17th-place finish. He ran again in Indy Lights later in the year at the Grand Prix of Baltimore; he crashed twice due to faulty rear suspension, first in qualifying for the event, and then in the race, finishing 12th of 13 cars.

In 2014, Newton-John returned to the ARCA Racing Series, driving for Carter 2 Motorsports at Madison International Speedway; running as a start-and-park, he finished 23rd.

Personal life
A native of Los Angeles, California, Newton-John is the son of Graham Hall and Rona Newton-John (1941–2013), stepson of Jeff Conaway, half-brother of Fiona Goldsmith, Brett Goldsmith and Tottie Goldsmith, and the nephew of Olivia Newton-John. He is named after two-time Indianapolis 500 winner Emerson Fittipaldi. He is married, and has two children.

Newton-John is the founder of the charitable organization Pink and Blue for Two, focused on breast and prostate cancer awareness.

Motorsports career results

American open–wheel racing results
(key)

Indy Lights

NASCAR
(key) (Bold − Pole position awarded by qualifying time. Italics − Pole position earned by points standings or practice time. * – Most laps led.)

Craftsman Truck Series

 Season still in progress 
 Ineligible for series points

ARCA Racing Series
(key) (Bold – Pole position awarded by qualifying time. Italics – Pole position earned by points standings or practice time. * – Most laps led.)

References

External links

Living people
1974 births
Racing drivers from Los Angeles
American people of German-Jewish descent
Indy Lights drivers
Formula Holden drivers
NASCAR drivers
ARCA Menards Series drivers